Capital Towers is a complex of three residential skyscrapers with 267 m height under construction in Moscow, Russia. It is located near the Moscow International Business Center on a Moskva River bank. The three skyscrapers are named Park Tower, City Tower and River Tower. The construction started in 2017 and will end in 2022. Upon completion the Capital Towers will be one of the tallest buildings in Moscow and in Europe.

Gallery

References

External links 
 

Residential skyscrapers in Moscow
Buildings and structures under construction in Russia